Bresimo (Brésem,  in local dialect) is a comune (municipality) in Trentino in the northern Italian region Trentino-Alto Adige/Südtirol, located about  northwest of Trento.

Bresimo borders the following municipalities: Ulten, Rumo, Rabbi, Livo, Cis, Malè, and Caldes.

References

Cities and towns in Trentino-Alto Adige/Südtirol